The Last Post is the first physical (CD) album released by Carbon/Silicon, preceded by the EPs The News and The Magic Suitcase. Released in 2007, the album consists of one new track and new Bill Price mixes of older tracks from previous download only releases A.T.O.M and Western Front.

A subsequent 2008 French version, with new artwork, added two further tracks ("Ignore Alien Orders" and "I Loved You") and a second disc featuring the live set Live At Carbon Casino VII.

Track listing 
All songs by Tony James and Mick Jones

 "The News" - 5:39
 "Magic Suitcase" - 4:26
 "The Whole Truth" - 4:42
 "Caesars Palace" - 5:28
 "Tell It Like It Is" - 5:09
 "War on Culture" - 6:03
 "What the Fuck" - 3:14
 "Acton Zulus" - 4:42
 "National Anthem" - 5:10
 "Really the Blues" - 5:30
 "Oilwell" - 5:55
 "Why Do Men Fight?" - 5:17
 "Ignore Alien Orders" - 5:41 (French version only)
 "I Loved You" - 4:30 (French version only)

Personnel
Mick Jones - vocals, guitar
Tony James - guitar, producer
Leo "E-ezy Kill" Williams - bass
Dominic Greensmith - drums
Tim Young - mastering
Neil Tucker - assistant
Tim Roe - assistant
Declan Gaffney - assistant
Zoe Smith - assistant
James "Famous" Jones - design
Chris Page - promoter

References

2007 albums
Carbon/Silicon albums
Albums produced by Bill Price (record producer)